Kaithi, also called Kayathi or Kayasthi, is a historical Brahmic script that was used widely in parts of Northern and Eastern India, primarily in the present-day states of Uttar Pradesh, Jharkhand and Bihar. In particular, it was used for writing legal, administrative and private records. It was used for a variety of Indo-Aryan languages, including Awadhi, Bhojpuri, Hindustani, Magahi, and Nagpuri.

Etymology

Kaithi script derives its name from the word Kayastha, a social group of India that traditionally consists of administrators and accountants. The Kayastha community was closely associated with the princely courts and British colonial governments of North India and were employed by them to write and maintain records of revenue transactions, legal documents and title deeds; general correspondence and proceedings of the royal courts and related bodies. The script used by them acquired the name Kaithi.

History

Documents in Kaithi are traceable to at least the 16th century. The script was widely used during the Mughal period. In the 1880s, during the British Raj, the script was recognised as the official script of the law courts of Bihar. Kaithi was the most widely used script of North India west of Bengal. In 1854, 77,368 school primers were in Kaithi script, as compared to 25,151 in Devanagari and 24,302 in Mahajani. Among the three scripts widely used in the 'Hindi Belt', Kaithi was widely perceived to be neutral, as it was used by both Hindus and Muslims alike for day-to-day correspondence, financial and administrative activities, while Devanagari was used by Hindus and Persian script by Muslims for religious literature and education. This made Kaithi increasingly unfavorable to the more conservative and religiously inclined members of society who insisted on Devanagari-based and Persian-based transcription of Hindi dialects. As a result of their influence and due to the wide availability of Devanagari type as opposed to the incredibly large variability of Kaithi, Devanagari was promoted, particularly in the Northwest Provinces, which covers present-day Uttar Pradesh. Kaithi was also nicknamed "Shikasta Nagari" by analogy with Shikasta Nastaliq, because the relationship of Kaithi to Devanagari was perceived as akin to the relationship between the widely used dot-less Shikasta Nastaliq of the time and the more formal printed Nastaliq scripts, which used dotted letters and fuller, less abbreviated letter forms.

In the late 19th century, John Nesfield in Oudh, George Campbell of Inverneill in Bihar and a committee in Bengal all advocated for the use of Kaithi script in education. Many legal documents were written in Kaithi, and from 1950 to 1954 it was the official legal script of Bihar district courts. However, it was opposed by Brahmin elites and phased out. Present day Bihar courts struggle to read old Kaithi documents.

Classes 

On the basis of local variants Kaithi can be divided into three classes viz. Bhojpuri, Magahi and Trihuti.

Bhojpuri 

This was used in Bhojpuri speaking regions and was considered as the most legible style of Kaithi.

Magahi 
Native to Magah or Magadh it lies between Bhojpuri and Trihuti.

Tirhuti 
It was used in Maithili speaking regions and was considered as the most elegant style.

Consonants
All Kaithi consonants have an inherent a vowel:

Vowels
Kaithi vowels have independent (initial) and dependent (diacritic) forms:

Diacritics
Several diacritics are employed to change the meaning of letters:

Punctuation
Kaithi has several script-specific punctuation marks:

General punctuation is also used with Kaithi:
  plus sign can be used to mark phrase boundaries
  hyphen and  hyphen-minus can be used for hyphenation
  word separator middle dot can be used as a word boundary (as can a hyphen)

Digits
Kaithi uses stylistic variants of Devangari digits.  It also uses common Indic number signs for fractions and unit marks.

Unicode

Kaithi script was added to the Unicode Standard in October 2009 with the release of version 5.2.

The Unicode block for Kaithi is U+11080–U+110CF:

See also
Devanagari
Sylheti Nagari
Gujarati script
Modi script

References

Culture of Mithila
Obsolete writing systems